TWC Aviation, Inc., now owned by Landmark Aviation, was an international business aviation company with operations centers at San Jose International Airport, in San Jose, California, Van Nuys Airport in Los Angeles, and Westchester County Airport, in White Plains, New York.

History
TWC Aviation was founded in Las Vegas, Nevada, in February 1998, by Andrew M. Lessman, owner of vitamin manufacturer ProCaps Laboratories. TWC Aviation began operations with a Hawker 800 business jet based at McCarran International Airport. Adding aircraft management and aircraft sales services, TWC Aviation relocated in 2001 to Bob Hope Airport in Burbank, California. The move positioned the company in the lucrative Greater Los Angeles market, serving clients throughout Southern California. In 2002, TWC Aviation acquired Corporate Aircraft Technical Services, an FAA Part 145 Repair Station. This enabled the company to offer FAA-certified aircraft maintenance and repair services. By 2008, TWC Aviation was serving charter and management clients nationwide, and had outgrown the Burbank facility. The company moved to a new custom-built operations center and hangar complex at Van Nuys Airport in Los Angeles, one of the world's busiest commercial aviation airports.

Acquisition
In 2010, TWC Aviation acquired ACM Aviation Services, an aircraft management and charter company founded in 1981 by Mike Markkula, the entrepreneur and investor who helped launch Apple Computer. This acquisition effectively doubled the size of the company, and added operations centers in San Jose, California, and White Plains, New York.
In April 2015 TWC was purchased by Landmark Aviation and became a wholly owned subsidiary of Landmark.

TWC Aviation has recently expanded into the increasingly affluent Asian market, particularly the Greater China Region, comprising Hong Kong, Macau, Taiwan and mainland China. In March 2012, the company announced a strategic alliance with Hong Kong-based Sino Jet Management Limited. Under the terms of the agreement, TWC Aviation is the exclusive operator for Sino Jet's charter services throughout the Asia-Pacific region, and Sino Jet is TWC Aviation's exclusive marketing agent in Asia.

TWC Aviation ranked 3,668 on the 2011 “Inc. 5000” list of America's fastest growing companies (Inc. Magazine, August 2011), and was named the 35th Fastest Growing Private Company in Los Angeles by the Los Angeles Business Journal (November 2011). In 2011, TWC Aviation earned an NBAA Commercial Business Flying Safety Award from the National Business Aviation Association for 26,838 accident-free hours over 11 years.

Services
TWC Aviation provides aircraft management, jet charter, jet membership, aircraft sales, aircraft acquisitions, aircraft management, and consulting services to corporations and high-net-worth individuals. Managed aircraft are based in the United States, the United Kingdom, Hong Kong, and Singapore, and operate under the company's FAA FAR Part 135 Air Carrier Certificate. The company is registered to the International Standard for Business Aviation Operations (IS-BAO) by the nonprofit International Business Aviation Council, registered to the ACSF Industry Audit Standard (IAS) by the nonprofit Air Charter Safety Foundation. and audited and certified by independent aviation safety organizations, including Wyvern Consulting, Ltd.

References

External links
Official Website
Private Jet Charter

Charter airlines of the United States
Companies based in San Jose, California
Transportation in San Jose, California
Airlines based in California